Simonida Nemanjić (c. 1294 – after 1336), born Simonis Palaiologina (sr. Симонида Палеолог, Simonida Paleolog), was a Byzantine princess and queen consort of the Kingdom of Serbia, wife of Serbian king Stefan Milutin (r. 1282–1321). Queen Simonida was a daughter of the Byzantine Emperor Andronikos II Palaiologos (r. 1282–1328) and Irene of Montferrat. In Medieval Serbia Queen Simonida is best remembered as a patron of Fine Arts, Arts and Letters.

Life 
Princess Simonida was born in Constantinople ca. 1294. In 1298, when a result of a Byzantine defeat, Emperor Andronikos II promised a marriage alliance to the Serbian ruler Milutin. The Orthodox Diocese in Constantinople opposed the marriage, but the emperor was determined to do so, and in late 1298 he sent his trusted minister Theodore Metochites to Serbia to conduct the negotiations. 
On his part, King Milutin too was eager to accept, and even divorced his wife, Ana Terter, the daughter of the Bulgarian tsar George Terter. 
Queen Simonida and King Milutin's marriage was celebrated in Thessalonica springtime of 1299, and the couple departed for Serbia. 
As a wedding present, Byzantines recognized Serbian rule north of the line Ohrid—Prilep—Štip.

Queen Simonida showed great interest in theology at a rather young age and wanted to become a nun. 
After her mother Irene died in 1317, Queen Simonida decided not to return to Serbia. When King Milutin's entourage came for his wife, she appeared in monastic habit. King Milutin's people were astounded, yet her own half-brother Constantine Palaiologos ordered for civil dress. Queen Simonida went to Serbia with King Milutin's entourage, although she was reluctant to do so. After King Milutin threatened to start a war, Queen Simonida came back with him. Queen was 22 years old. When Milutin fell ill, she was beside him all the time, much to the surprise of the rest of the court. King Milutin died on 19 October 1321, and already on 29 October, Queen Simonida returned to Constantinople, where she entered the monastery of Saint Andrew in Krisei as a nun.
There is very little information about her later life. Queen Simonida was last mentioned in historical documents in 1336, as a part of an assembly of civil and religious dignitaries who were stopping the conspirators. It is said that Queen Simonida died some time after 1345.

Legacy 
Queen Simonida's beauty was well known, and she was known as a figure of clarity and beauty in Serbian tradition. A fresco of her in Gračanica monastery is regarded as one of the most valuable frescos in Serbian art. Unfortunately, the fresco is partially ruined since the Muslim invasions of those times, so that the fresco of Queen Simonida has damages at eyes.

Queen Simonida brought a large entourage to Serbia, and with her arrival, Serbia received a boost of Byzantine culture. 
Byzantine-style court ceremonials and dress were adopted, Byzantine honorary, functional titles appeared, and court offices, legal institutions were renewed. Byzantine ways were further expanded by Serbia's newly won populous Greek-speaking regions, in which the King Milutin retained all former Byzantine political, social and cultural activities. 

A famous Serbian poet Milan Rakić wrote a lyric poem about the Byzantine Queen, titled Simonida, and Milutin Bojić wrote a psychological drama called Kraljeva Jesen ("King's autumn") about the Byzantine Queen. One of the asteroids 1675 Simonida discovered by Serbian astronomer Milorad B. Protić was named after Byzantine Queen (Simonida).

Ancestry

See also
 Kassia
 Anna Komnene
 Jefimija
 Princess Milica of Serbia
 Saint Angelina of Serbia
 Mara Branković
 Olivera Despina
 Jelena Balšić
 Helen of Anjou
 Maria Angelina Doukaina Palaiologina
 Nicodemus of Tismana

References

Further reading

External links

|-

1294 births
1340s deaths
14th-century Serbian royalty
14th-century Byzantine nuns
Serbian queens consort
Greek women of the Byzantine Empire
Medieval Serbian royal consorts
Medieval Serbian people of Greek descent
Palaiologos dynasty
Nemanjić dynasty
Year of death unknown
Daughters of Byzantine emperors
14th-century Serbian women